Reginald Thomas Lye (14 October 1912 – 23 March 1988), was an Australian actor who worked extensively in Australia and England. He was one of the busiest Australian actors of the 1950s, appearing in the majority of locally shot features at the time, as well as on stage and radio. Lee Robinson called him "one of the best character actors in Australia." He moved to England in the early 1960s, (also starring in television, such as Mrs Thursday and The Wednesday Play), but returned to Australia when the film industry revived in the 1970s.

He won the Australian Film Institute award for the his role in the 1975 film, Sunday Too Far Away, opposite Jack Thompson.

Selected filmography

King of the Coral Sea (1954) - Grundy
Smiley (1956) - Pa Bill Greevins
Walk Into Paradise (1956)  - Ned 'Shark-eye' Kelley
Three in One (1957) - The Swaggie (segment "Joe Wilson's Mates")
The Shiralee (1957) - Desmond
The Stowaway (1958) - Buddington
Smiley Gets a Gun (1958) - Pa Greevins
The Flaming Sword (1958) - Poggy
Dust in the Sun (1958) - Dirks
The Restless and the Damned (1959) - Matthews
The Grey Nurse Said Nothing (1959)
The Dock Brief (1960, by John Mortimer) - Fowle
The One Day of the Year (1961, by Alan Seymour) - Wacka
The Amorous Prawn (1962) - Uncle Joe (the poacher)
Reunion Day (1962, by Peter Yeldham) - Carmody
The Wrong Arm of the Law (1963) - Reg Denton
The Counterfeit Constable (1964) - Le chauffeur de taxi fatigué
Stell (1964, by Peter Yeldham) 
King Rat (1965) - Tinker Bell
The Wrong Box (1966) - Third Undertaker
A Challenge for Robin Hood (1967) - Much
Fathom (1967) - Mr. Trivers
Danger Route (1967) - Balin
The Magnificent Six and ½: It's Not Cricket (1968) - Angry Houseowner
Doctor Who (1968, British TV) - Griffin the Chef
The Lost Continent (1968) - Helmsman
Battle of Britain (1969) - Workman (uncredited)
The Games (1970) - Gilmour
Performance (1970) - Workman (uncredited)
10 Rillington Place (1971) - Tramp
Burke & Hare (1971) - Old Joe 
Ooh… You Are Awful (1972) - Bogus Milkman (uncredited)
The Amazing Mr. Blunden (1972) - Sexton
Dracula (1974) - Zookeeper
Sunday Too Far Away (1975) - Old Garth
Quiller (1975) - Chirac
Blind Man's Bluff (1977) - Uncle Fred
Jabberwocky (1977) - Hawker (uncredited)
Death on the Nile (1978) - Workman (uncredited)
Wombling Free (1978) - Assistant Surveyor
A Man Called Intrepid (1979) - Newsvendor
Unidentified Flying Oddball (1979) - Prisoner
Tarka the Otter (1979) - Dairy Farmer
The Killing of Angel Street (1981) - Riley
Freedom (1982) - Old farmer
Molly (1983) - Old Dan

References

External links

Reg Lye at National Film and Sound Archive

1912 births
1988 deaths
Australian male film actors
Australian male television actors
Male actors from Sydney
20th-century Australian male actors